Taffy Mupariwa (born 3 April 1996) is a Zimbabwean cricketer. He made his first-class debut for Matabeleland Tuskers in the 2014–15 Logan Cup on 15 February 2015. In February 2017, he was named in an academy squad by Zimbabwe Cricket to tour England later that year.

References

External links
 

1996 births
Living people
Zimbabwean cricketers
Matabeleland Tuskers cricketers
Rising Stars cricketers
Sportspeople from Bulawayo